Robert Treman Clendenin (born April 14, 1964) is an American actor. He is best known for portraying Dr. Tom Gazelian in ABC comedy series Cougar Town and Dr. Paul Zeltzer in the comedy series Scrubs.

Education
Clendenin graduated from Cornell University in 1986 and earned his Master of Fine Arts from Penn State University in 1990. He has subsequently built an acting career defined by roles as oddball characters in TV and film.

Career
He has played more than 110 roles in films, TV and web series.

Television career
He appeared on numerous shows including The Tick, Popular, Charmed (3x10), Will & Grace, The New Adventures of Old Christine, Ugly Betty, Felicity, Weeds, Gilmore Girls, NYPD Blue, Desperate Housewives, The League, Space: Above and Beyond, Roswell, The Middle, Mixed-ish. He appeared as a Vidiian surgeon on Star Trek: Voyager, Earl on That '70s Show, Slow Roger on My Name Is Earl, drug dealer Jamie DeBell on Netflix's Longmire, and on several episodes of The Closer.

He has appeared on many of John Lehr's shows including Quick Draw, Jailbait, and TBS' 10 Items or Less, where he played main character Carl Dawson.

He had recurring roles on two Bill Lawrence's TV shows, Scrubs  and Cougar Town, and appeared in cross-over between two series. On the former he played Dr. Selzer, and on the latter he played Tom, a comedically bizarre neighbor who has a crush on the main character, Jules Cobb (Courteney Cox). After recurring on show for five seasons, he was upgraded to the regular cast in season six. Clendenin also played the role of the town undertaker Vernon Shank in the Hulu original series Quick Draw.

Film career
His films include Kazaam, L.A. Confidential, Moonlight Mile, Dude, Where's My Car?, where he played one of the space nerds, the 2009 film Star Trek, where he appeared as a ship yard worker who interacts with Kirk, Wish I Was Here, and Paul Blart 2.

Other work
Clendenin appeared in the 2011 Rockstar Games video game LA Noire as Irwin Bousman.

Clendenin has also appeared in commercials for Jack In The Box, GoDaddy, Progressive, and State Farm. He starred as devil-may-care Ted in the 2008 film short Daryl From OnCar. This short was produced for WGA-affiliated StrikeTV, a site created to benefit crew affected by the writer's strike of Nov. 5, 2007 - Feb. 12, 2008.

Selected filmography

Film
 Kazaam (1996) as Stage Manager
 L.A. Confidential (1997) as Reporter at Hollywood Station
 Dude, Where's My Car? (2000) as Zarnoff
 Moonlight Mile (2002) as Server #1
 Race to Witch Mountain (2009) as Lloyd
 Star Trek (2009) as Shipyard Worker
 Wish I Was Here as Defense Attorney
 Paul Blart: Mall Cop 2 as Murhtelle

TV
 Felicity (1998-2002) as Mr. Norman (5 episodes)
 Popular (1999-2001) as Godfrey (8 episodes)
 That '70s Show (2000-2001) as Earl (3 episodes)
 3rd Rock From The Sun (2001) as Man #1 (Credited as Rober Clendenin) (1 episode)
 Scrubs (2002-2009)  as Dr. Paul Selzer (7 episodes)
 Desperate Housewives (2005) as Louis (1 episode)
 The Closer (2005-2009) as Dr. Terrence (6 episodes)
 Nobody's Watching (2006) as Roy Ingold (unaired pilot)
 Monk (2006) as Gerald Vengal (1 episode)
 10 Items or Less (2006-2009) as Carl Dawson (21 episodes)
 My Name Is Earl (2007-2008) as Slow Roger (3 episodes)
 Cougar Town (2010-2015) as Dr. Tom Gazelian (64 episodes) 
 Newsreaders (2013) as Roscoe Thurnpike (1 episode)  
 The Exes (2015) as Arnie (1 episode) 
 Mixed-ish (2020) as Principal Taylor (2 episodes)
 The Neighborhood (2021) as Stan (1 episode)
 Reboot (2022) as Dougie (1 episode)

References

External links

RobertClendenin.com
Personal Blog

1964 births
American male television actors
Cornell University alumni
Penn State College of Arts and Architecture alumni
Living people
Male actors from Ohio
People from Newark, Ohio
21st-century American male actors
20th-century American male actors